Just Short of Perfect is a 2021 Brazilian comedy film directed by Ale McHaddo, written by Michelle Ferreira and starring Letícia Birkheuer, Elizângela and Leandro Hassum. The film was released by Netflix on November 18, 2021. It is the fifth remake of the Argentinian film . Ivana Taveres, a tall and newly divorced attorney begins a romantic relationship with Ricardo Leon, a short widowed doctor.

Plot 
When Ivana loses her phone at a coffee shop, Ricardo finds it and calls her home phone. They decide to meet at the coffee shop the next morning, and she is surprised by how short he is. As a cardiologist, he sees that she is stressed and takes her sky-diving. He has to cut the date short when the Pope, visiting Brazil, is hospitalized and needs an emergency surgery. Ricardo asks his daughter, Manu, for advice on how to ask Ivana out, while Ivana battles her divorce with her ex-husband, Danilo.

Ivana and Ricardo have a romantic dinner date, where they share a kiss. For their next date, they go to a music club, where Ricardo performs live. In the middle of the performance, a creepy man tries to flirt with Ivana. The man makes fun of Ricardo's height and challenges Ricardo to a dance-off, in which Ricardo wins. They spend the night together at Ricardo's place, and Ivana realizes the challenges that come with being Ricardo's height. 

Danilo sees Ivana with Ricardo and mocks his height, but Ivana defends him. Ivana invites Ricardo over for lunch and he has trouble reaching the utensils needed to make the meal. Ivana's mother calls her and she doesn't tell her about Ricardo. She hesitantly invites him to her brother's wedding reception party the upcoming weekend. At the party, Ivana introduces Ricardo to her family as her friend. When Ivana steps away, her mother asks Ricardo to help get Ivana and Danilo get back together. 

The next day, when Ivana tells her mother that she is seeing Ricardo, she responds with prejudice towards Ricardo's height, so Ivana gets frustrated and leaves the car. Ricardo comes to Ivana's office to visit her and Danilo insults him. The two men get into a physical fight, and Danilo creates a misunderstanding between Ricardo and Ivana. Thinking Ivana is playing him because she is ashamed of him, Ricardo breaks up with her. Both Ricardo and Ivana are devastated by the break-up. Manu tells Ricardo to accept himself first before expecting Ivana to accept him.    

At her brother's wedding, Ivana realizes how Danilo and her mother created the misunderstanding between her and Ricardo. She tells them both off, and her father starts speak up in support of her when he experiences apparent heart problems. They rush him to Ricardo's hospital while Ricardo shows up to the wedding venue. When Ricardo arrives to treat him, everyone is relieved that he is just suffering from severe gas. Ivana's brother's wedding continues at the hospital. She and Ricardo both give a speech and kiss each other.

Cast 
 Juliana Paes as Ivana Taveres
 Leandro Hassum as Ricardo Leon
 Marcelo Laham as Danilo Taveres
 Luana Martau as Corina
 Pietra Hassum as Manuela Leão
 Letícia Birkheuer as Dr. Cláudia
 Elizângela as Márcia Alvarenga
 Casey Frost as Fred
 Johnny Klein as Nurse Fran
 Marcelo Mansfield as Adolfo Alvarenga
 Eduardo Montenegro as Jacob
 Delurdes Moraes as Odete
 Rogerio Morgado
 Eduardo Mossri as Wladimir Alvarenga
 Mário José Paz as Pope Francisco
 Teca Pereira as Nurse Joyce
 Carol Portes as Ceremonialist
 Rafael Portugal as Raul

References

External links
 
 

2021 comedy films
Brazilian comedy films
Portuguese-language Netflix original films
2020s Portuguese-language films
2021 films
Buena Vista International films